C&H can refer to:
California and Hawaiian Sugar Company
Calvin and Hobbes, a comic strip that ran from 1985 to 1995
Cyanide and Happiness, a webcomic and webseries